Lawrence Park Collegiate Institute (Lawrence Park CI, LPCI, "LP", or Lawrence Park) is a semestered, public high school institution with over 1,267 students enrolled. The school is located in Toronto, Ontario, Canada. It teaches grades 9 through 12 and is operated and governed by the Toronto District School Board. Until 1998, the school was part of the former Toronto Board of Education.

The school is located in the Lytton Park neighbourhood. The majority of students come from the surrounding Bedford Park, Lytton Park, North Toronto, and Lawrence Park areas. The closest TTC subway station is Lawrence station.

History
Lawrence Park Collegiate was founded in 1936. Charles W. Robb was the school's first principal and went on to become the Superintendent of Secondary Education for Toronto. The front entrance was built with Beaux-Arts elements.

Sports

There are over 50 athletic clubs that wear the Panther colours of blue and gold. In recent years Lawrence Park has won TDSB Championships in Swimming, (boys and girls), Cross Country, Curling (girls), Ice Hockey (girls), Soccer (boys and girls), Track and Field, Tennis, Volleyball, Alpine Skiing (boys and girls) and Snowboarding.

In March 2016 both the girls' Curling team and the girls' Hockey team won OFSAA championships.

In 2018 Lawrence Park CI were the OFSAA Girls’ AAA soccer champions.

Fall sports

Cross Country
Girls Junior Basketball 
Girls Senior Basketball
Boys Junior Football
Boys Senior Football
Boys Golf
Girls Fall Rugby
Boys Rugby 7's
Girls Rugby 7's
Girls Field Hockey
Boys Junior Soccer
Boys Senior Soccer	 
Tennis	 
Boys Junior Volleyball
Boys Senior Volleyball

Winter sports

Curling (Boys and Girls)
Hockey (Boys and Girls)
Boys Junior Basketball
Boys Senior Basketball
Girls Junior Volleyball	 
Girls Senior Volleyball
Ski Team
Snowboarding Team
Swim Team
Indoor Soccer

Spring sports

Badminton
Boys Baseball
Girls Rugby
Boys Junior Rugby
Boys Senior Rugby
Girls Soccer
Girls Softball
Track & Field
Water Polo
Ultimate Frisbee

Drama

Lawrence Park has a very large and active Drama Council that is responsible for various events at the school. The council plans and runs the Remembrance Day assembly. 
Each year the council runs United Artists for a Cause, a performing arts night that includes music, drama and a fashion show. Lawrence Park is one of few schools that enters 2 plays in the NTS (formerly Sears) drama festival in addition to hosting the festival. Each year, there is a school play performed for hundreds of people including Arsenic and Old Lace (2016), Departures and Arrivals (2017) and Anne of Green Gables (2018).  Dramatic productions take place in a very large and recently upgraded auditorium with a new LED lighting system installed in 2017. "Masquerade," a school magazine, showcases the music, drama and visual arts programs at Lawrence Park Collegiate.

Clubs and council

Clubs
Lawrence Park Collegiate offers a wide variety of clubs and councils. The students, along with their staff advisors, are currently running close to 30 different clubs within the school. They include:

Chess Club
Future Business Leaders of America Club
The Panther Print (student newspaper)
Women's Empowerment Club
United Artists
Stage Crew
Philosophy Club
Classics Club
Guitar Club
Lawrence Park Jewish Student Union
Investment Club
Astronomy Club
United Way CN Tower Climb
Buddies
Young Women's Empowerment Group
Debate Club
Announcements Crew
Multicultural Club
Bowling Club
Frisbee-Golf Club 
Ping Pong Club
Esports Club
Youth Volunteerism Club
Entrepreneurship Club

Councils
The school also has multiple councils for students to join, ranging from the Student Council to the Classics Council to the Athletic Council.

LP Wellness Council
LP Student Council
LP Athletic Council (LPAC)
LP Library Council
LP Drama Council
LP Eco-Council
LP Music Council
LP Classics Council
LP Art Council
LP GSA

Teams
There are some groups that are not labeled as clubs nor councils but are still involved in the school. These are:

LP Ambassadors 
LP Buddies
LP Dance Show
LP Gender and Sexualities Alliance
LP Music
LP Panther Print
LP Reach for the Top
LP Volunteerism 
LP Yearbook Committee

Feeder schools
Lawrence Park has three main feeder schools from around the area:

Glenview Senior Public School
Bedford Park Public School
Blessed Sacrament Catholic School

Students from John Wanless Public School, John Ross Robertson Public School, John Fisher Public School, and Allenby Public School graduate to Glenview Senior Public School and then to Lawrence Park, while students from Bedford Park Junior Public School and Blessed Sacrament go straight to Lawrence Park as they go from Kindergarten to grade 8.

Movies and videos

Canadian singer Shiloh sang in a music video that was shot in and outside the school.
Many MTV commercials were shot in the school.
The movie The Pacifier has one of its fight scene taken in the south gym on the first floor.
Scenes from Being Erica'''s pilot episode was shot in the school's basement and main floor hallway
Scenes for Dick was filmed at this school.
Scenes for Model Behavior was filmed at this school.
The Goosebumps episodes Phantom Of The Auditorium and It Came From Beneath The Sink were filmed in and outside the school.

Notable alumni
Robbie Amell is a Canadian actor and model. 
Craig Arnold is a Canadian Actor
Liane Balaban is a Canadian actress.
JR Bourne is a Canadian actor best known for his role in Teen Wolf. 
Claudia Casper is a Canadian writer, best known for her bestselling novel The Reconstruction.'
Jonathan Crombie was a Canadian actor and voice over artist, best known for playing Gilbert Blythe in CBC Television's 1985 telefilm Anne of Green Gables and its two sequels.
Kelleth Cuthbert is a Canadian actress, model and personality.
Richard Harrison is a Canadian poet, writer and editor of numerous books including ‘On Not Losing My Father’s Ashes in the Flood’, which won the Governor General's literary award for Poetry in 2017. 
Lawrence Heisey  was a Canadian businessman and philanthropist.  He was president and chairman of Harlequin Enterprises Limited.
Evan Jones is a Canadian poet and critic.
Mark-Anthony Kaye is a Canadian soccer player.
Ghislaine Landry is a Canadian rugby union player.
Elaine Lui is a Canadian television personality, reporter, and infotainer.
Amanda Marshall is a Canadian pop-rock singer.
Lois Maxwell was a Canadian actress, best known for her portrayal of Miss Moneypenny in the first 14 James Bond films
Don McKellar is a Canadian actor, writer, and filmmaker.
Gord Perks is a Canadian environmentalist, political activist, writer and is the current city councillor for Toronto's Ward 14, Parkdale—High Park municipal electoral district.
Fiona Reid is an English-born Canadian television, film, and stage actress.
Rob Stewart was a Canadian photographer, filmmaker and conservationist.
Beverly Thomson is a Canadian journalist and correspondent with CTV News Channel.
Neil Young is a Canadian singer-songwriter, musician, producer, director and screenwriter.

See also
List of high schools in Ontario

References

External links
Lawrence Park Collegiate Institute at the Toronto District School Board website.

High schools in Toronto
Schools in the TDSB
Educational institutions established in 1936
1936 establishments in Ontario